Naderabad (also Romanized as Nāderābād; also known as Nādirābād and Qāderābād) is a village in Garakan Rural District, in the Central District of Ashtian County, Markazi Province, Iran. At the 2006 census, its population was 508, in 135 families.

References 

Populated places in Ashtian County